Eann Styvenson Valentim Mendes (born 7 February 1977) more commonly known as Styvenson Valentim is a Brazilian politician, as well as a captain in the Brazilian military police. Although born in Acre, he has spent his political career representing Rio Grande do Norte, having served as federal senator since 2019.

Personal life
Valentim served in the Brazilian military police and attained the rank of captain. In the media he is often referred to as "Capitão Styvenson".

Political career
Valentim was elected to the federal senate in the 2018 Brazilian general election. In 2019 Valentim switched to the Podemos party.

References 

1977 births
Living people
People from Rio Branco, Acre
Brazilian police officers
Members of the Federal Senate (Brazil)
Sustainability Network politicians
Podemos (Brazil) politicians